Holly Hale (born 1990) is a Welsh model and beauty pageant titleholder who was crowned Miss Universe Great Britain 2012.

A student of psychology at Cardiff University, and the second consecutive Welsh contestant to capture the title, Holly said: “Miss Universe is the first pageant I have ever entered and so I cannot believe I’ve won! It is so exciting. I’m really hoping to make everyone proud.”

Holly represented Great Britain in the 2012 Miss Universe contest.

References

1990 births
Living people
Miss Universe 2012 contestants
Welsh beauty pageant winners
Welsh female models